Jemma Madeleine Wellesley, Countess of Mornington (née Kidd; born 20 September 1974), is a British make up artist, fashion model, and aristocrat. 

She currently resides on the Stratfield Saye estate, Hampshire.

Biography

Early life
Lady Mornington is the elder daughter of Johnny Kidd, businessman and former showjumping champion.  and Wendy Madeline Hodge Kidd. Wendy Kidd is the daughter of Sir John Rowland Hodge, 2nd Baronet, and founder of the Holder's Festival. Mornington is also a paternal granddaughter of Janet Gladys Aitken and great-granddaughter of Lord Beaverbrook, who founded The Daily Express. Her younger sister is former model Jodie Kidd.

Career
Lady Mornington was a fashion model before becoming a make-up artist. In 2003, she opened her own "Make-up School" in London. 

She was a director of the Jemma Kidd Make-up Limited, which was incorporated in 2005, Ghislaine Maxwell was also a director. The company launched a cosmetics range in 2006, which was available in the UK (in Boots), America, Australia, Hong Kong, and Canada. 

Her book Jemma Kidd Make-up Masterclass was published in 2009.

Jemma Kidd Make-up went into administration in October 2012. It was dissolved in January 2020.

Personal life
The wedding of Jemma Kidd with Arthur Wellesley, Earl of Mornington, took place at St James Church in Holetown, Barbados, on 4 June 2005. 

The couple have twins and a younger son:
 Lady Mae Madeleine Wellesley (born 4 January 2010 at Chelsea and Westminster Hospital in London)
 (Arthur) Darcy Wellesley, Lord Wellesley (born 4 January 2010)
 The Honourable Alfred Wellesley (born 10 December 2014)

Lady Mornington is separated from Lord Mornington, the heir apparent of the 9th Duke of Wellington. 
The couple announced their separation in August 2020.

References

External links 
 

1974 births
Living people
Models from London
People from Guildford
Jemma
Douro
English female models
Aitken family
Jemma
British make-up artists
Mornington